Historic Locust Grove is a 55-acre 18th-century farm site and National Historic Landmark situated in eastern Jefferson County, Kentucky in what is now Louisville. The site is owned by the Louisville Metro government, and operated as a historic interpretive site by Historic Locust Grove, Inc.

The main feature on the property is the ca. 1790 Georgian mansion that was the home of the Croghan family and gathering place for George Rogers Clark, Lewis and Clark, and U.S. Presidents. In addition to the mansion there is the Visitors Center that houses a gift shop, museum and meeting space.

Dozens of African Americans were enslaved at Locust House by the Croghans between 1790 and 1849. At the peak of the farm’s operations in 1820, more than 40 enslaved people labored there.

History
The site was founded in 1790 by William Croghan and his wife Lucy Clark Croghan. The house and outbuildings were built by enslaved African Americans. Enslaved people also planted and harvested the crops, cooked the meals, made the family's clothing, washed their laundry, and were caregivers for the Croghan children. 

Lucy was the sister of Brigadier General  George Rogers Clark, former surveying partner of William Croghan and William Clark of the Lewis and Clark Expedition.

Tracing their way back from the Pacific Ocean, on November 8, 1806, Meriwether Lewis and William Clark arrived at Locust Grove to a homecoming where Lucy Clark Croghan and her family welcomed them back from their journey.  Locust Grove became the only residence still in existence west of the Appalachian Mountains to have sheltered Lewis and Clark.  In the Fall of 2006, Locust Grove commemorated the 200th anniversary of Lewis and Clark's return.

George Rogers Clark lived at the site in the final years of his life, from 1809 to 1818.

The property was adjacent to Springfield, the home of Colonel Richard Taylor and his son, future U.S. President Zachary Taylor.

Following the death of William Croghan, the estate passed to John C. Croghan, notable for his purchase of Mammoth Cave in 1838.

In the winter of 1844, the enslaved African-American Stephen Bishop produced a map of Mammoth Cave. His map was published in 1845 and remained the most complete and accurate map of the period until modern survey techniques were applied in 1908. A significant epilogue to Bishop's story occurred in 1972, when a long-sought route connecting the caves of Flint Ridge and Mammoth Cave Ridge was discovered in an area which Bishop had mapped, but which had in the interim been almost completely flooded by the construction of a dam on the surface nearby: the area of the 20th Century connection route is shown on Bishop's 19th century map.

It was declared a National Historic Landmark in 1986, as one of the few surviving residences associated with George Rogers Clark.

Gallery

See also
Farmington Historic Plantation
List of attractions and events in the Louisville metropolitan area
 List of the oldest buildings in Kentucky
List of parks in the Louisville metropolitan area
Riverside, The Farnsley-Moremen Landing
List of National Historic Landmarks in Kentucky

References

External links

Official Locust Grove website
Locust Grove—Lewis and Clark Expedition: A National Register of Historic Places Travel Itinerary

Houses completed in 1790
18th-century buildings and structures in Louisville, Kentucky
Houses in Louisville, Kentucky
Parks in Louisville, Kentucky
Museums in Louisville, Kentucky
Tourist attractions in Louisville, Kentucky
Local landmarks in Louisville, Kentucky
National Register of Historic Places in Louisville, Kentucky
National Historic Landmarks in Kentucky
Historic house museums in Kentucky
Farms on the National Register of Historic Places in Kentucky
1790 establishments in Virginia
Plantations in Kentucky